Writer's block is a phenomenon involving the temporary (psychological) loss of ability to write.

Writer's block may also refer to:

 The Writer's Block, an independent bookseller and literacy educator in Las Vegas, Nevada
 The Writers' Block, a Canadian comedy web series
 Writer's Block (Evergreen Terrace album), 2004
 Writer's Block (Peter Bjorn and John album), 2006
 "Writer's Block" (Just Jack song), 2006
 "Writer's Block" (Royce da 5'9" song), 2011